The Pembroke Deanery is a Roman Catholic deanery in the Diocese of Menevia, Swansea, Wales that covers several churches in Pembrokeshire and the surrounding area. In the early 2010s, the Aberystwyth Deanery was dissolved and its churches in Ceredigion were distributed to the surrounding deaneries. The churches in the north, such as those in Aberystwyth, became part of the Llandrindod Wells Deanery, Lampeter went to the Carmarthen Deanery and the western churches, such as those in Cardigan, became part of the Pembroke Deanery.

The dean is centred at St David and St Patrick Church in Haverfordwest.

Churches
 Abbey of Our Lady and St Samson, Caldey Island
 Our Lady of the Taper, Cardigan
 Our Lady Queen of Peace, Newcastle Emlyn - served from Cardigan
 Holy Name, Fishguard
 St Michael, St Davids - served from Fishguard
 St David and St Patrick, Haverfordwest
 Immaculate Conception, Narberth - served from Haverfordwest
 St Francis of Assisi, Milford Haven
 Holyrood and St Teilo Church, Tenby
 St Bride, Saundersfoot - served from Tenby
 Holy Cross Abbey, Whitland

Gallery

References

External links
 Caldey island site
 Our Lady of the Taper site
 Holy Name Parish site
 St David and St Patrick Parish site
 St Francis of Assisi Parish site
 Holyrood and St Teilo Parish site
 Holy Cross Abbey site

Roman Catholic Deaneries in the Diocese of Menevia